Ching Cheong (born 22 December 1949) is a senior journalist with The Straits Times. He is best known for having been detained by the People's Republic of China on allegations of spying for Taiwan.  He was imprisoned from April 2005 to February 2008; spending over 1,000 days in prison.

Life
Ching was born in Guangzhou, China on 3 December 1949. He was educated in St. Paul's College, Hong Kong, and graduated from Hong Kong University in 1973 with a degree in Economics.

In 1974, he joined the pro-Communist China newspaper Wen Wei Po, of which he eventually became vice-editorial manager. After the Tiananmen massacre of 4 June 1989, Ching and around 40 other journalists resigned from the newspaper in protest. After that he, Li Zhisong, and others founded Commentary, a magazine commenting on China.

In 1996, he joined the staff of the Singapore-based Straits Times. At first he was assigned to the Taiwan desk, where his articles clearly showed a pro-unification stance. These articles are collected in a book called  'Will Taiwan Break Away: The Rise of Taiwanese Nationalism' . Ching was later named China correspondent for the journal.

Arrest on spy charges
In the spring of 2005, he entered mainland China on a Home Return Permit, while researching former Communist Party leader, Zhao Ziyang. On 22 April 2005, he was charged with spying on behalf of a foreign intelligence agency and was arrested in Guangzhou.

The Chinese Foreign Ministry later reported that he had confessed to these accusations. Formal charges were drawn up on 5 August. He was charged with passing state secrets to the Republic of China (Taiwan) over a period of five years. In particular, he was accused of using money provided by Taiwan to purchase political and military information. He is the first Hong Kong journalist to be charged with spying since the transfer of the sovereignty of Hong Kong to the PRC in 1997. Ching's wife, Mary Lau, said the charges were 'ludicrous'. She also added that Ching had apparently fallen victim to entrapment by an intermediary as he was trying to obtain recordings of secret interviews with the former Prime Minister.

In June 2005, the Hong Kong Journalists Association and Reporters Without Borders organised a petition calling for Ching's immediate release from unfair detention. The petition, containing more than 13,000 signatures, was sent to Hu Jintao, then General Secretary of the Chinese Communist Party and President of the People's Republic of China. The International Federation of Journalists and the Committee to Protect Journalists also protested Ching Cheong's detention. The British Government was also asked to intervene as Ching Cheong held a British National (Overseas) passport.

During the incident, some tabloids in Hong Kong insinuated that he was spying because he had to earn money for a mistress in China. The supposed mistress went to Hong Kong from China and gave witness that she had no relationship with Ching. The accusation ceased when a lot of evidence showed that Ching Cheong was innocent.

On 12 January 2006, 35 legislative councillors including 10 pro-Beijing councillors (including three from the Liberal Party, three from the DAB, and one from the Alliance Party) signed an open letter asking the Chinese authorities to release Ching unless there was sufficient evidence.

On 22 February 2006, the prosecutor in charge of Ching's case decided to send his file back to the State Security Department for further investigation. The trial was thus delayed for at least one month.

Ching was tried in camera, found guilty of spying, and was sentenced on 31 August 2006 to five years' imprisonment.
The family's statement on the same day stated the verdict was extremely biased, adopting only evidence of the Procuratorate while ignoring almost all defence arguments and Ching's defence.

On 1 September 2006, Ching's wife reported that her husband had called the verdict "very unfair" and vowed to appeal the sentence.

On 5 February 2008, the Chinese government announced that they had released Ching from prison early, days before the Chinese New Year holiday.

See also
 Jiang Weiping

References

China frees Hong Kong journalist, BBC

Published works
Will Taiwan Break Away: The Rise of Taiwanese Nationalism (Singapore University Press, 2001) 
with Ching Hung-Yee: Handbook on China's WTO Accession and Its Impacts (Imperial College Press, 2003)

External links
Ching Cheong Foundation Ltd.'s official site (in Chinese)
Reporters Sans Frontiers article
Ching Cheong trial adjourned for lack of evidence
International press freedom groups call for Ching Cheong's release: IFEX
Hong Kong Journalists Association
"Red Fear in Hong Kong", The Asia Times, 9 June 2005.
"Journalist held for seeking truth on Tiananmen killings", The Times Online, 31 May 2005.
"Detained Journalist's Wife Says China Set Him Up", Radio Free Asia, 31 May 2005.
"Zhao manuscript chase leads to arrest", The Standard, 31 May 2005.
 China rejects journalist appeal, BBC NEWS

1949 births
Hong Kong journalists
Living people
Chinese prisoners and detainees
Alumni of St. Paul's College, Hong Kong
Alumni of the University of Hong Kong
Prisoners and detainees of the People's Republic of China
Writers from Chaozhou